Julius Abdulahad Gallo Shabo (born 1951) is an Oriental Orthodox archbishop of the Syriac Orthodox Church for Sweden and Scandinavia. Since 1987, he leads the Syriac Orthodox Archdiocese of Sweden and Scandinavia, whose cathedral is the Saint Jacob of Nsibin Syriac Orthodox Cathedral in Södertälje.

See also
Christianity in Sweden

References

Sources

External links
Syriac Orthodox Church (2017): Special Meeting in Switzerland
Syriac Orthodox Resources: The Church Today

Syriac Orthodox Church bishops
Oriental Orthodoxy in Sweden
20th-century Oriental Orthodox archbishops
1951 births
Living people
21st-century Oriental Orthodox archbishops